Academy of the Arts at Henry Snyder High School is a four-year performing arts public high school serving students in ninth through twelfth grades, located in the Greenville section of Jersey City, New Jersey, United States, operating as part of the Jersey City Public Schools. The school has been accredited by the Middle States Association of Colleges and Schools Commission on Elementary and Secondary Schools since 1940.

As of the 2021–22 school year, the school had an enrollment of 800 students and 59.0 classroom teachers (on an FTE basis), for a student–teacher ratio of 13.6:1. There were 475 students (59.4% of enrollment) eligible for free lunch and 23 (2.9% of students) eligible for reduced-cost lunch.

Awards, recognition and rankings
The school was the 319th-ranked public high school in New Jersey out of 339 schools statewide in New Jersey Monthly magazine's September 2014 cover story on the state's "Top Public High Schools", using a new ranking methodology. The school had been ranked 279th in the state of 328 schools in 2012, after being ranked 312th in 2010 out of 322 schools listed. The magazine ranked the school 304th in 2008 out of 316 schools. The school was ranked 298th in the magazine's September 2006 issue, which surveyed 316 schools across the state.

Schooldigger.com ranked the school 344th out of 376 public high schools statewide in its 2010 rankings (an increase of 10 positions from the 2009 rank) which were based on the combined percentage of students classified as proficient or above proficient on the language arts literacy and mathematics components of the High School Proficiency Assessment (HSPA).

Athletics
The Henry Snyder High School Tigers compete in the Hudson County Interscholastic League (HCIAA), which is comprised of public and private high schools in Hudson County and operates under the supervision of the New Jersey State Interscholastic Athletic Association. With 883 students in grades 10–12, the school was classified by the NJSIAA for the 2019–20 school year as Group III for most athletic competition purposes, which included schools with an enrollment of 761 to 1,058 students in that grade range. The football team competes in the National Red division of the North Jersey Super Football Conference, which includes 112 schools competing in 20 divisions, making it the nation's biggest football-only high school sports league. The school was classified by the NJSIAA as Group III North for football for 2018–2020.

The boys bowling team won the overall state championship in 1963.

The boys track team won the Group IV indoor track championship in 1965, 1971 (as co-champion) and 1975 (co-champion).

The boys track team won the Group IV indoor relay state championship in 1971, 1972 (co-champion with Westfield High School), 1974 and 1975.

The boys track team won the Group IV spring track state championship in 1971 (as co-champion).

The boys basketball team won the Group III state championship in 1990, defeating John F. Kennedy Memorial High School by a score of 65-46 in the tournament final played at the Rutgers Athletic Center and advanced to the Tournament of Champions as the fifth seed, defeating number-four seed Bogota High School by a score of 47-46 in the quarterfinals before falling to top-seeded Elizabeth High School 74-46 in the semifinals to finish the season with a mark of 28-4.

Administration
The school's principal is Yvonne Waller. Her administration team includes three assistant principals.

Notable alumni

 Nick Adams (1931–1968), actor who appeared in Hollywood films and on television during the 1950s and 1960s
 Rafael Addison (born 1964), former professional basketball player who played in the NBA for the Phoenix Suns, New Jersey Nets, Detroit Pistons and Charlotte Hornets.
 Walker Lee Ashley (born 1960), retired linebacker who played in the NFL for the Minnesota Vikings and Kansas City Chiefs.
 Robert Burns (1926-2016), politician who served two terms in the New Jersey General Assembly from the 38th Legislative District.
 Albert Burstein (born 1922), politician who served five terms in the New Jersey General Assembly, representing the 37th Legislative District.
 Glenn Cunningham (1943-2004), politician who served in the New Jersey Senate and was the first African American Mayor of Jersey City.
 Matthew Feldman (1919–1994), politician who served in the New Jersey Senate and as Mayor of Teaneck, New Jersey.
 Leon Gast (1936–2021), film director, producer, cinematographer and editor best known for his documentary When We Were Kings
 Rich Glover (born 1950, class of 1969), 1972 Outland Trophy and Lombardi Award winner; Nebraska (1970-72); NFL 1973, 1975
 Gerald Govan (born 1942), retired basketball player who played in all nine seasons of the original American Basketball Association
 Jerry Herman (born 1931), composer and lyricist
 Derek Luke (born 1974), actor who won multiple awards for his big-screen debut performance in the 2002 film Antwone Fisher
 Bill Perkins (1941-2016), running back in the American Football League for the New York Jets who later became an attorney and politician who served two terms in the New Jersey General Assembly.
 Harold Reitman (born 1950), orthopedic surgeon and former professional boxer.
 Peter Sliker (1925–2010), opera singer with the Metropolitan Opera
 Shirley Tolentino (1943–2010), first black woman to serve on the New Jersey Superior Court and to be appointed to the Jersey City Municipal Court and serve as its presiding judge

References

External links

 
 Jersey City Public Schools
 
 School Data for the Jersey City Public Schools, National Center for Education Statistics

Snyder
Middle States Commission on Secondary Schools
Public high schools in Hudson County, New Jersey
Schools of the performing arts in the United States